Emilian Lundraxhiu (born 9 May 1994) is an Albanian footballer who plays as a defender for German lower league side OSC Bremerhaven.

Club career
Lundraxhiu played for several Albanian clubs including Erzeni Shijak. He joined Bremer SV from Vatan Sport in January 2018.

References

External links
 
 
 Profile - FSHF

1994 births
Living people
People from Peqin
Association football defenders
Albanian footballers
Albania youth international footballers
KS Shkumbini Peqin players
KF Gramshi players
FK Tomori Berat players
KF Erzeni players
Bremer SV players
OSC Bremerhaven players
Kategoria Superiore players
Kategoria e Parë players
Albanian expatriate footballers
Albanian expatriate sportspeople in Germany
Expatriate footballers in Germany